The Bamberg Post Office, located in the city and county of Bamberg, South Carolina, United States, was built in 1937-38 and is significant as an example of a New Deal-era post office. The Bamberg Post Office was listed in the National Register of Historic Places on May 22, 2007.

References

Post office buildings on the National Register of Historic Places in South Carolina
Government buildings completed in 1937
Buildings and structures in Bamberg County, South Carolina
National Register of Historic Places in Bamberg County, South Carolina